This was a new event in the ITF Women's Circuit.

Julia Glushko and Rebecca Peterson won the inaugural title, defeating Viktorija Golubic and Stephanie Vogt in the final, 4–6, 7–5, [10–6].

Seeds

Draw

References 
 Draw

CopperWynd Pro Women's Challenge - Doubles